Agua Salud is a Caracas Metro station on Line 1. It was opened on 2 January 1983 as part of the inaugural section of Line 1 between Propatria and La Hoyada. The station is between Gato Negro and Caño Amarillo.

Agua Salud is one of the only two above ground stations of Line 1.

References

External links 
 

Caracas Metro stations
1983 establishments in Venezuela
Railway stations opened in 1983